Hessle and Hill Top is a civil parish in the metropolitan borough of the City of Wakefield, West Yorkshire, England.  The parish contains five listed buildings that are recorded in the National Heritage List for England.  All the listed buildings are designated at Grade II, the lowest of the three grades, which is applied to "buildings of national importance and special interest".  The listed buildings consist of a house, a pair of cottages, a forge, a road bridge, and a former toll house.


Buildings

References

Citations

Sources

 

Lists of listed buildings in West Yorkshire